Santa Cruz, officially the Municipality of Santa Cruz, is a 1st class municipality in the province of Marinduque, Philippines. According to the 2020 census, it has a population of 54,692 people.

History
Republic Act No. 204, approved May 28, 1948, converted the sitios of Angas of the barrio of Tagum, Biga of the barrio of Alobo, Kamandungan of the barrio of Lusok, Kilokilo of the barrio of San Antonio, and Makulapnit of the barrio of Devilla to regular and independent barrios.

In 1953, the sitio of Baguidbirin was converted into a barrio.

Geography
The municipal jurisdiction also includes the islands of Maniwaya, Mongpong, Salomague, and Santa Cruz (also known as Polo Island), as well as several minor islets.

Barangays

Santa Cruz is politically subdivided into 55 barangays. In 1957 the sitio of Kalangkang, barrio of Kasily, was converted into a barangay.

Climate

Demographics

Economy

Transportation
Access to the municipality:
 Via sea - Balanacan Port Mogpog (ferry coming from Lucena, ro/ro and fastcrafts)
 Via air - Marinduque Airport-(Cebu Pacific Operate by Cebgo) Starts Operation on April 1, 2019- Jeepney to Santa Cruz via Boac

Sister cities
 Valenzuela City, Philippines (2008)
 Virac, Catanduanes, Philippines (2008)
 Naval, Biliran, Philippines (2008)
 Jolo, Sulu, Philippines (2010)
 Basco, Batanes, Philippines (2010)

References

External links

[ Philippine Standard Geographic Code]
Philippine Census Information
Local Governance Performance Management System

Municipalities of Marinduque